Hollie Pearne-Webb,  (born 19 September 1990) is an English field hockey player who plays as a defender for Wimbledon and the England and Great Britain national teams.

She attended The Ecclesbourne School.

Club career
Pearne-Webb plays club hockey in the Women's England Hockey League Premier Division for Wimbledon.
 
She has also played for Surbiton, Beeston, Cannock and Belper.

International career
Pearne-Webb made her senior international debut for England v South Africa in the 2013 Women's Hockey Investec Cup, on 4 February 2013.
One year later she made her senior international debut for Great Britain v New Zealand in a test match in San Diego, California, on 11 February 2014.

She competed for England in the women's hockey tournament at the 2014 Commonwealth Games where she won a silver medal. She scored the winning penalty in the 2016 Olympic final in Rio de Janeiro.  This was the Great Britain women's national field hockey team's first gold medal at an Olympic Games.

Pearne-Webb was awarded the MBE in the 2017 New Year Honours List. On 7 March 2017 she was granted the Freedom of the Borough of Amber Valley.

References

External links

 
 
 

1990 births
Living people
Commonwealth Games silver medallists for England
English female field hockey players
Field hockey players at the 2014 Commonwealth Games
People from Belper
Sportspeople from Derbyshire
Alumni of the University of Sheffield
Field hockey players at the 2016 Summer Olympics
Field hockey players at the 2020 Summer Olympics
Olympic field hockey players of Great Britain
Medalists at the 2016 Summer Olympics
Olympic gold medallists for Great Britain
Olympic medalists in field hockey
Commonwealth Games medallists in field hockey
Members of the Order of the British Empire
Female field hockey defenders
Beeston Hockey Club players
Surbiton Hockey Club players
Women's England Hockey League players
Olympic bronze medallists for Great Britain
Medalists at the 2020 Summer Olympics
Medallists at the 2014 Commonwealth Games
Medallists at the 2018 Commonwealth Games
Medallists at the 2022 Commonwealth Games